The 1955 Wrexham by-election was a by-election held on 17 March 1955 for the British House of Commons constituency of Wrexham in Denbighshire, Wales.

The by-election was caused by the death of the town's Labour Party Member of Parliament (MP) Robert Richards, who had held the seat since the 1935 general election.

The result was a victory for the Labour candidate James Idwal Jones, who held the seat with a majority of nearly 11,000 votes.

Result

See also
 List of United Kingdom by-elections
 Wrexham constituency

Sources

References

External links
 British parliamentary by-elections: Wrexham 1955
 UK General Election results October 1951: Wrexham
 A Vision Of Britain Through Time (Constituency elector numbers)

By-elections to the Parliament of the United Kingdom in Welsh constituencies
1955 elections in the United Kingdom
1955 in Wales
1950s elections in Wales
Wrexham
March 1955 events in the United Kingdom